Defensive Player of the Year (DPOY or DPOTY) is the name of an award given in sports for outstanding defensive play by a single player over the course of a season.  Many sports leagues award this type of award.  League awards for Defensive Player of the Year is include:

American football

Professional
National Football League Defensive Player of the Year Award
Associated Press NFL Defensive Player of the Year Award
Newspaper Enterprise Association NFL Defensive Player of the Year Award (1966–1999)
Pro Football Writers of America NFL Defensive Player of the Year Award

College
ACC Defensive Player of the Year
Big East Conference Defensive Player of the Year
Mid-American Conference Defensive Player of the Year
Nagurski–Woodson Defensive Player of the Year
STATS FCS Defensive Player of the Year

Baseball
 Wilson Defensive Player of the Year Award

Basketball

Professional
BAL Defensive Player of the Year
DBL Defensive Player of the Year
Israeli Basketball Premier League Defensive Player of the Year
Hakeem Olajuwon Trophy (NBA)
NBA G League Defensive Player of the Year Award
NBL Defensive Player of the Year
NBL Canada Defensive Player of the Year Award
Korisliiga Defensive Player of the Year
New Zealand NBL Defensive Player of the Year Award
PBA Defensive Player of the Year Award
VTB United League Defensive Player of the Year
WNBA Defensive Player of the Year Award
WNBL Defensive Player of the Year Award
Úrvalsdeild Women's Defensive Player of the Year

College
Big East Conference Men's Basketball Defensive Player of the Year
Lefty Driesell Defensive Player of the Year Award
NABC Defensive Player of the Year
Naismith Defensive Player of the Year Award
Pac-12 Conference Men's Basketball Defensive Player of the Year
WBCA Defensive Player of the Year

Ice hockey
MAAC Defensive Player of the Year

Lacrosse
National Lacrosse League Defensive Player of the Year Award

Softball
Big 12 Conference Softball Defensive Player of the Year

Sports trophies and awards
American football terminology
Basketball terminology